Enkutatash (Ge'ez: እንቁጣጣሽ) is a public holiday in coincidence of New Year in Ethiopia and Eritrea. It occurs on Meskerem 1 on the Ethiopian calendar, which is 11 September (or, during a leap year, 12 September) according to the Gregorian calendar.

Origin
According to Ethiopian tradition, on 11 September Queen of Sheba (Makeda in Ethiopian) returned to Ethiopia from her visit to King Solomon in Jerusalem. Her followers celebrated her return by giving her jewels. Hence ‘‘Enkutatash’’ means the ‘‘gift of jewels’’.

Observance
This holiday is based on the Ethiopian calendar.  It is the Ethiopian New Year.

Large celebrations are held around the country, notably at the Raguel Church on Mount Entoto.

According to InCultureParent, "after attending church in the morning, families gather to share a traditional meal of injera (flat bread) and wat (sauce). Later in the day, young girls donning new clothes, gather daisies and present friends with a bouquet, singing New Year's songs." According to the Ethiopian Tourism Commission, "Enkutatash is not exclusively a religious holiday. Modern Enkutatash is also the season for exchanging formal new year greetings and cards among the urban sophisticated – in lieu of the traditional bouquet of flowers."

The Ethiopian counting of years begins in the year 8 of the common era. This is because the common era follows the calculations of Dionysius, a 6th-century monk, while the non-Chalcedonian countries continued to use the calculations of Annius, a 5th-century monk, which had placed the Annunciation of Christ exactly 8 years later. For this reason, on Enkutatash in the year 2016 of the Gregorian calendar, it became 2009 in the Ethiopian calendar.

See also
 Culture of Ethiopia
 Culture of Eritrea
 New Year's Day

References

External links
Enkutatash 2005

Ethiopian culture
New Year celebrations
Public holidays in Ethiopia
September observances